The tibia is a bone in the leg of humans and other vertebrates. 

Tibia may also refer to:
 Tibia (gastropod), a genus of sea snails
 Tibia (instrument) or aulos, an ancient Greek and Roman wind instrument
 Tibia (organ pipe), a sort of organ pipe that is most characteristic of a theatre organ
 Tibia (video game), a 1997 MMORPG
 Tibia (arthropod leg), a segment of the arthropod leg